Arapahoe at Village Center station is an light rail station in Greenwood Village, Colorado, United States. It is served by the E and R Lines, operated by the Regional Transportation District (RTD), and was opened on November 17, 2006. In addition to numerous office buildings and corporate campuses, the station is the destination for people attending concerts at the Fiddler's Green Amphitheatre. The station also serves as the terminus for the SkyRide AT bus route, with service to Denver International Airport, and is also served by the Bustang Denver Technology Center (DTC) service. The station features a public art installation of a trio of sculptures entitled Nucleus. It was created by Michael Clapper and dedicated in 2010.

References 

RTD light rail stations
Railway stations in the United States opened in 2006
Greenwood Village, Colorado
Railway stations in Arapahoe County, Colorado